Arleen Lyda Paré (born 1946) is a Canadian writer. She has published three collections of poetry and two novels to date.

Originally from Montreal, Quebec, Paré was educated in social work and adult education, and worked in social services in Vancouver, British Columbia for much of her professional career. She later left her social services job to study creative writing at the University of Victoria.

Her first book, Paper Trail, was published in 2007. A blend of poetry and prose about a businesswoman finding herself stifled by the weight of corporate bureaucracy, the book was a shortlisted nominee for the Dorothy Livesay Poetry Prize in 2008, and won that year's City of Victoria Butler Book Award. She followed up with the novel Leaving Now in 2012.

Her 2014 poetry collection Lake of Two Mountains won the Governor General's Award for English-language poetry at the 2014 Governor General's Awards.

A lesbian, she once served on the board of Plenitude magazine.

Works
Paper Trail (2007)
Leaving Now (2012)
Lake of Two Mountains (2014)
He Leaves His Face in the Funeral Car (2015)
The Girls with Stone Faces (2017)
Earle Street (2020)
First (2021)
Time Out of Time (2022)

References

External links

1946 births
Living people
Canadian lesbian writers
Canadian LGBT poets
Canadian LGBT novelists
Canadian women novelists
Canadian women poets
Governor General's Award-winning poets
Writers from Montreal
Writers from Vancouver
Writers from Victoria, British Columbia
21st-century Canadian novelists
21st-century Canadian poets
21st-century Canadian women writers
21st-century Canadian LGBT people
Lesbian novelists